Vincent de Paul, CM (24 April 1581 – 27 September 1660), commonly known as Saint Vincent de Paul, was an Occitan French Catholic priest who dedicated himself to serving the poor.

In 1622 Vincent was appointed a chaplain to the galleys. After working for some time in Paris among imprisoned galley slaves, he returned to be the superior of what is now known as the Congregation of the Mission, or the "Vincentians" (in France known as "Lazaristes").

These priests, with vows of poverty, chastity, obedience, and stability, were to devote themselves entirely to the people in smaller towns and villages. Vincent was zealous in conducting retreats for clergy at a time when the local clergy's morals were flagging. He was a pioneer in seminary education and founded the Congregation of the Mission and the Daughters of Charity of Saint Vincent de Paul.

He was renowned for his compassion, humility, and generosity. Vincent was canonized in 1737 and is venerated as a saint in both the Catholic Church and the Anglican Communion.

Early life and education

Vincent de Paul was born in 1581 in the village of Pouy, in the Province of Guyenne and Gascony, the Kingdom of France, to peasant farmers; his father was Jean and his mother Bertrande de Moras de Paul. There was a stream named the "Paul" in the vicinity and it is believed that this might have been the derivation of the family name. He wrote the name as one word – Depaul, possibly to avoid the inference that he was of noble birth, but none of his correspondents did so. He had three brothers – Jean, Bernard, and Gayon – and two sisters, Marie and Marie-Claudine. He was the third child. He demonstrated a talent for literacy early in life, but also worked as a child, herding his family's livestock. At 15, his father sent him to seminary, which he paid for by selling the family's oxen.

For three years, Vincent studied at a college in Dax, France. It adjoined a monastery of the Friars Minor, where he resided. In 1597, he enrolled in theology at the University of Toulouse. The atmosphere at the university was rough. Fights broke out between various factions of students which escalated into armed battles. An official was murdered by two students. Nevertheless, he continued his studies, financing them by tutoring others. He was ordained on 23 September 1600, at the age of nineteen, in Château-l'Évêque, near Périgueux. This was against the regulations established by the Council of Trent which required a minimum of 24 years of age for ordination, so when he was appointed parish priest in Tilh, the appointment was appealed in the Court of Rome. Rather than respond to a lawsuit in which he would probably not have prevailed, he resigned from the position and continued his studies. On 12 October 1604, he received his Bachelor of Theology from the University of Toulouse. Later he received a Licentiate in Canon Law from the University of Paris.

Abduction and enslavement 
Traditional biographies of Vincent describe his capture and enslavement during two years away from France, from 1605 to 1607. More recent biographies, starting with Antoine Rédier's La vraie vie de Saint Vincent de Paul, doubt this narrative. The biographer Pierre Coste, who wrote Monsieur Vincent, a comprehensive biography based on correspondence, interviews, and documents, publicly confirmed the accuracy of Vincent's captivity and enslavement. According to Rédier, Coste held the opposing view in private, and questioned the reliability of the two letters supporting the account of Vincent's enslavement. To avoid scandal and possible backlash, Coste kept his doubt of the slavery narrative private. Skeptics agree that the letters themselves were written by Vincent, but question Vincent's account of the events of 1605–1607. There is no alternative account of Vincent's life during these two years, but Pierre Grandchamps and Paul Debongnie argue that the captivity narrative is implausible.

According to the letters, in 1605, Vincent sailed from Marseilles on his way back from Castres where he had gone to sell property he had inherited from a wealthy patron in Toulouse. He was taken captive by Barbary pirates, who took him to Tunis. De Paul was auctioned off as a slave, and spent two years in bondage.

His first master was a fisherman, but Vincent was unsuitable for this line of work due to sea-sickness and was soon sold. His next master was a spagyrical physician, alchemist and inventor. He became fascinated by his arts and was taught how to prepare and administer his master's spagyric remedies.

The fame of Vincent's master became so great that it attracted the attention of men who summoned him to Istanbul. During the passage, the old man died and Vincent was sold once again. His new master was a former Catholic priest and Franciscan from Nice, Guillaume Gautier. He, Gautier, had converted to Islam in order to gain his freedom from slavery and was living in the mountains with three wives. The second wife, a Muslim by birth, was drawn to and visited Vincent in the fields to question him about his faith. She became convinced that his faith was true and admonished her husband for renouncing his Christianity. Her husband became remorseful and decided to escape back to France with his slave. They had to wait ten months, but finally they secretly boarded a small boat and crossed the Mediterranean, landing in Aigues-Mortes on 29 June 1607.

Return to Europe
After returning to France, Vincent went to Rome. There he continued his studies until 1609, when he was sent back to France on a mission to King Henry IV. Once in France, he made the acquaintance of Pierre de Bérulle, whom he took as his spiritual advisor. André Duval, of the Sorbonne introduced him to Canfield's "Rule of Perfection". Vincent was by nature a rather irascible person, but he slowly learned to become more sensitive to the needs of others.

In 1612 he was sent as a parish priest to the Church of Saint-Medard in Clichy. In less than a year, Bérulle recalled him to Paris to serve as a chaplain and tutor to the Gondi family. "Although Vincent had initially begun his priesthood with the intention of securing a life of leisure for himself, he underwent a change of heart after hearing the confession of a dying peasant." It was the Countess de Gondi who persuaded her husband to endow and support a group of able and zealous missionaries who would work among poor tenant farmers and country people in general.

On 13 May 1643, with Louis XIII dead, Queen Anne had her husband's will annulled by the Parlement de Paris (a judicial body comprising mostly nobles and high clergymen), making her the sole Regent of France. Anne nominated Vincent de Paul as her spiritual adviser; he helped her deal with religious policy and the Jansenism question.

Foundation of religious congregations
In 1617, Vincent contacted the Daughters of Charity and they then introduced him to poor families. Vincent then brought them food and comfort. He organized these wealthy women of Paris to collect funds for missionary projects, founded hospitals, and gather relief funds for the victims of war and to ransom 1,200 galley slaves from North Africa. This participation of women would eventually result in, with the help of Louise de Marillac, the Daughters of Charity of Saint Vincent de Paul, a Society of Apostolic Life for women within the Catholic Church.

In 1622 Vincent was appointed a chaplain to the galleys. After working for some time in Paris among imprisoned galley slaves, he returned to be the superior of what is now known as the Congregation of the Mission, or the "Vincentians" (in France known as "Lazaristes"). These priests, with vows of poverty, chastity, obedience, and stability, were to devote themselves entirely to the people in smaller towns and villages.

Vincent was zealous in conducting retreats for clergy at a time when there was great laxity, abuse, and ignorance among them. He was a pioneer in clerical training and was instrumental in establishing seminaries. He spent 28 years serving as the spiritual director of the Convent of St. Mary of Angels.

Vincent died in Paris on 27 September 1660.

The Society of Saint Vincent de Paul
Vincent is the patron of all works of charity. A number of organizations specifically inspired by his work and teaching and which claim Vincent as their founder or patron saint are grouped in a loose federation known as the Vincentian Family. The 1996 publication The Vincentian Family Tree presents an overview of related communities from a genealogical perspective.

Among these organizations is the Society of Saint Vincent de Paul, a charitable organization dedicated to the service of the poor, established in 1833 by French university students, led by the Frederic Ozanam. The society is today present in 153 countries.

Veneration

In 1705, the Superior General of the Congregation of the Mission requested that the holy process of Vincent's canonization be instituted. On 13 August 1729 he was declared blessed by Pope Benedict XIII. He was canonized nearly eight years later by Pope Clement XII on 16 June 1737.

Vincent's body was exhumed in 1712, 53 years after his death. The written account of an eyewitness states that "the eyes and nose alone showed some decay". However, when it was exhumed again during the canonization in 1737, it was found to have decomposed due to an underground flood. His bones have been encased in a waxen figure which is displayed in a glass reliquary in the chapel of the headquarters of the Vincentian fathers in Paris, Saint Vincent de Paul Chapel, rue de Sèvres. His heart is still incorrupt, and is displayed in a reliquary in the chapel of the motherhouse of the Daughters of Charity in Paris.

In 1737, Vincent's feast day was included in the Roman Calendar for celebration on 19 July, this date being chosen because his day of death was already used for the feast of Saints Cosmas and Damian. The new celebration was given the rank of "Double", and was changed to the rank of "Third-Class Feast" in 1960. The 1969 revision of the General Roman Calendar transferred his memorial to 27 September, moving Cosmas and Damian to 26 September to make way for him, as he is now better known in the West than them.

Vincent is honored with a Lesser Festival on 27 September in the Church of England. The Episcopal Church liturgical calendar honors him together with Louise de Marillac on 15 March.

One of the feasts celebrated by the French Deist Church of the Theophilanthropy was dedicated to Vincent.

Legacy
Niagara University in Lewiston, NY, St. John's University in New York, New York, and DePaul University in Chicago, Illinois were founded in 1856, 1870 and 1898, respectively, by the Congregation of the Mission in the United States.

Parishes are dedicated to Vincent in Los Angeles; Washington, DC; Syracuse, New York; Chicago, Illinois; Omaha, Nebraska; Mays Landing, New Jersey; Mt. Vernon, Ohio. Houston, Texas; Delray Beach, Florida; Wheeling, West Virginia, Coventry, Rhode Island, Churchville, New York, Peryville, Missouri, Lenox Dale, Massachusetts, Girardville, Pennsylvania, Arlington, Texas, Denver, Colorado, and elsewhere.

Schools are also dedicated in Vincent's name. High schools, DePaul College Prep, affiliated with DePaul University, in Chicago, Illinois and DePaul Catholic High School, in Wayne, New Jersey; Los Angeles

St. Vincent de Paul Village, a mission-style campus of affordable and supportive apartments is dedicated in Vincent's name in San Diego, CA.

In New Zealand, the Society of St Vincent de Paul was founded in July 1867 by Father Jean Baptiste Chataigner, a Marist priest (Society of Mary). It is a lay organisation working towards a "more just and compassionate society".

A long-term care 1,200 bed facility for elderly people is dedicated to St. Vincent de Paul in Malta. In the Philippines, a church is dedicated to him located in Ermita, Manila, Adamson University and San Juan de Dios College adopted him as their Patron Saint after the Vincentian Priests took over the University and College.

The example of Vincent de Paul and the Lazarists inspired Charles Fuge Lowder to found the Society of the Holy Cross in the Church of England.

A 1983 St. Vincent statue is exhibited in Indianapolis, Indiana.

See also
List of Superior Generals of the Congregation of the Mission
List of Catholic saints
List of slaves
Saint Vincent de Paul, patron saint archive
Union chrétienne de Saint-Chaumond (Poitiers) – Cofounded by St. Vincent de Paul

References

External links

 

Founder Statue in St Peter's Basilica
Vincent on Leadership: The Hay Project
"St. Vincent of Paul, Kethepally" , De Paul School at Kethepally was established in the year 2001.

1581 births
1660 deaths
17th-century Christian saints
17th-century French Roman Catholic priests
17th-century French writers
17th-century French male writers
Vincentians
Founders of Catholic religious communities
French male non-fiction writers
French religious writers
French Roman Catholic saints
Catholic chaplains
Counter-Reformation
French chaplains
Vincentian saints
Incorrupt saints
Anglican saints
People captured by pirates
People from Landes (department)
Slaves from the Ottoman Empire
17th-century slaves
Venerated Catholics
Canonizations by Pope Clement XII
Beatifications by Pope Benedict XIII
Slavery in Tunisia